Robert Harry Morgan (25 January 1880 – 28 November 1960) was a Conservative Party politician in the United Kingdom.

He was elected at the 1931 general election as Member of Parliament (MP) for the Stourbridge division of Worcestershire, defeating the sitting Labour MP Wilfred Wellock. Morgan was re-elected in 1935 and held the seat until his defeat at the 1945 general election.

References

External links 

1880 births
1960 deaths
Conservative Party (UK) MPs for English constituencies
UK MPs 1931–1935
UK MPs 1935–1945